Interstate 66 (I-66) is a cancelled interstate designated in the Intermodal Surface Transportation Efficiency Act (ISTEA) of 1991 as the East–West TransAmerica Corridor and High Priority Corridor 3. The United States Department of Transportation originally planned to extend the current I-66 from its western terminus at Middletown, Virginia, across the country to California. The route west of Kansas was not favored by any of the related state highway departments, and as a result I-66 west of Wichita, Kansas, through New Mexico, Arizona, Nevada and California was cancelled. Among the reasons for this were lack of interest from any of the state highway departments, and the insufficient projected traffic did not justify an Interstate, especially since many segments had no pre-existing highway. The National Park Service was strongly opposed to building I-66 across the Death Valley National Park. The choice for the number I-66 was a hope to capitalize on name association with the decommissioned U.S. Route 66 (US 66). The case for westward expansion of I-66 was started by businesspeople in Wichita. Furthermore, there were no plans to build I-66 across the West Virginia–Virginia state line, leaving it as a non-contiguous highway. The I-66 concept was supported in Kentucky mainly because of the efforts of Congressman Hal Rogers; however, the Kentucky Transportation Cabinet completed its feasibility study in 2005 and concluded that building I-66 was too costly and of little traffic benefit with high potential environmental impact and cancelled the project in that state. The only remaining study of I-66 was conducted by the Federal Highway Administration (FHWA) and the Illinois Department of Transportation (IDOT) under the 66 Corridor Study, a Tier 1 environmental impact study (EIS). This study was cancelled August 6, 2015, by IDOT, and subsequently the FHWA announced the cancellation of the EIS in the Federal Register, ending the last I-66 project and therefore officially cancelling the I-66 Trans America Highway.

Route description

Kansas
I-66 was proposed to extend west from I-44 near Joplin, Missouri, to Wichita, Kansas.

Missouri
Missouri had several proposals to bring I-66 through the state: 
 Bringing I-66 from Kentucky through Illinois to Cape Girardeau; which required going through Shawnee National Forest
 Cross the Mississippi River with a new bridge, then follow I-57 to Sikeston, where it would have followed US 60 westward to Springfield.

Sikeston would have been the convergence point of three Interstates, I-55 to St. Louis and Memphis, I-57 to Chicago, and I-66 to Kentucky, in addition to the considerable pieces of the U.S. Highway System already present there, such as US 60, US 61, and US 62.  The Missouri Department of Transportation did not plan to proceed with any part of I-66 when Illinois and Kentucky dropped their commitment to the project.

Illinois
On August 17, 2011, IDOT received $3.7 million to conduct the 66 Corridor Study, a feasibility study that would investigate a route between Cape Girardeau on the Mississippi River and Paducah, Kentucky, on the Ohio River. The route would have utilized the existing Interstate 24 bridge at Paducah and new four-lane bridge at Cape Girardeau. The 66 Corridor concept was heavily opposed in Illinois from farmers to environmentalists because the plan required that I-66 cross the Shawnee National Forest. The FHWA and IDOT cancelled the 66 Corridor Study on July 9, 2015.

Kentucky
I-66 was planned to cross the Mississippi River east of Cape Girardeau, then continue east on a new alignment to I-24 north of Paducah. It would have followed I-24 east to Eddyville where it would have turned northeast following I-69 (Wendell H. Ford Western Kentucky Parkway) to the William H. Natcher Parkway, then turn southeast following the Natcher Parkway to I-65 near Bowling Green. Former governor Paul Patton had I-66 written into law in Kentucky, with the routing being confirmed along the Louie B. Nunn Cumberland Parkway. That state-supported designation had been echoed at the federal level; the 2002 federal highway authorization act authorized a future Interstate between I-57 in southeast Missouri and the I-73/I-74 proposed corridor in West Virginia, a few miles east of the Kentucky state line. This route was controversial, however; opponents worried that the segment between London and Somerset, currently served by the two- to four-lane Kentucky Route 80 (KY 80) would risk damaging delicate karst formations and environmentally sensitive areas of the Daniel Boone National Forest. Between London and Hazard, I-66 would have paralleled or replaced the super two Hal Rogers Parkway. The Interstate would have then turned northeast toward Pikeville and east to West Virginia.  The KYTC finished its final I-66 feasibility study in 2005 and concluded that I-66 was not cost beneficial for the foreseeable future to justify its construction or any further study, thereby cancelling Kentucky's participation in the I-66 project. Construction was completed in 2011, however, on a less controversial segment in western Pulaski County, relocating the eastern terminus of the Louie B. Nunn Cumberland Parkway to US 27, making it the only part ever constructed for the Southern Kentucky Corridor as it had officially named by then.

The Audubon and Natcher Parkways did remain as High Priority Interstate Corridors, referred to as the "Future Interstate Route 69 Spur" (presumptively I-369 for the Audubon Parkway; as I-169 has since been assigned to the Pennyrile Parkway between the I-69/WK Parkway interchange and I-24 near Hopkinsville) and the "Future Interstate Route 66 Spur" in the SAFETEA-LU Technical Corrections Act of 2008 which was signed into law on June 6, 2008. After I-66 was officially cancelled in 2015, the designation of the Natcher Parkway was changed from an "I-66 spur" to an "I-65 spur" in the Fixing America's Surface Transportation Act of 2015 (FAST). Kentucky Governor Matt Bevin submitted his 2016 Recommended Highway Plan in January 2016 to the state legislature to have the I-65 spur designated as I-565 (although the number eventually approved by AASHTO in 2017 is I-165). A total of $66 million in construction funds are planned to upgrade the Natcher Parkway to Interstate standards between Bowling Green and Owensboro.

West Virginia
The western segment of I-66 was proposed to end at the I-73/I-74/US 52 (King Coal Highway) in West Virginia, a few miles east of the Kentucky state line. West Virginia never planned any direct connection between this termination of I-66 and I-73/I-74 to the existing I-66 in Virginia and the District of Columbia, which would have made I-66 a non-contiguous Interstate. Travel between the two segments of freeway would have been possible by following the Future I-73/I-74/US 52 southeast, then northeast along the Future US 121 (Coalfields Expressway) to Beckley, north along I-79, and east on the Future US 48 (Corridor H) of the Appalachian Development Highway System (ADHS).

Virginia
The final segment of the TransAmerica Corridor (not I-66 though) in Virginia followed US 460 from the West Virginia border to Norfolk. US 460 was upgraded in Virginia before the TransAmerica Corridor concept existed as a four-lane divided highway with some interchanges and freeway bypasses around many of the towns and cities along the route. The Virginia Department of Transportation never committed to any Interstate freeway through the TransAmerica Highway, especially with the I-66 designation that would have duplicated the existing I-66 in Northern Virginia, and probably would have required changing the northern I-66 to some other new Interstate number since I-66 was the designation established by Congress for the TransAmerica Corridor. Building a third east–west freeway in Virginia was also not a high priority given the existence of I-64 to the Norfolk–Chesapeake area. Ambitious plans to build a public-private partnership toll-road parallel to US 460 from Norfolk to Petersburg have met with resistance and the toll-road project has been cancelled, with the new project now scaled back to improving and upgrading the existing US 460 maybe to a limited access expressway or to a fully controlled access freeway with some bypasses around some towns.

References

External links

 Information on origin and future plans of I-66
 Kentucky's Official Site for the Proposed Interstate 66
 

66
Kansas-Kentucky
66 (Kansas-Kentucky)